Crø̈ønchy Stars was a breakfast cereal by Post Cereal of North America. The cereal was released in 1988, and discontinued about a year later, though it made a brief return in 1992.  The box featured the Swedish Chef from The Muppet Show, who described the cereal as "cinnamonnamony". The product's name is likely a pseudo-phonetic rendition of how the Chef would pronounce "crunchy." The back of the box featured ridiculous, and sometimes unsolvable, games and puzzles, including a memory-type card game on every box.

In addition to the gratuitous umlaut in Cröonchy, most of the cereal's labeling and promotional material used the idiosyncratic spelling Swed̈ish Chef, with an umlaut over the letter "d".  This is an instance of an umlaut being unconventionally used over a consonant, as with Spın̈al Tap.

See also
 List of defunct consumer brands

References

External links
YouTube video of the 1988 Cröonchy Stars cereal commercial
YouTube video of the 1992 Cröonchy Stars cereal commercial
Cröonchy Stars – Muppet Wiki

Post cereals
The Muppets
Products introduced in 1988
Defunct consumer brands
Products and services discontinued in 1989